The Old Ideas World Tour was the final concert tour by Canadian poet and singer-songwriter Leonard Cohen, and was in support of his 2012 album Old Ideas. The tour started in August 2012, and ended in December 2013.

Background
On March 26, 2012 Cohen announced the first eighteen concerts taking place in Belgium, Denmark, Norway, Sweden, Finland, Germany, Ireland, Italy, France, Spain and Portugal forming part of the first European leg of the 'Old Ideas World Tour'. On April 2 two further concerts were added in Ghent due to high public demand and on April 4 it was announced that Cohen would perform a third concert for the same reason. It was revealed by the Telegraph newspaper that Cohen would perform his only UK show at the Hop Farm Country Farm in Kent in September. On May 17 a second concert at the Hop Farm Country Farm was announced for September 9. However, on August 23  both concerts would be moved to Wembley Arena in London, England, for unspecified reasons.

First European Leg

The first leg of the tour consisted of 31 shows, played all over Europe. The structure of each show was similar to the previous tour. The main set was split into two blocks with a short intermission in between. Many songs from the latest record were performed, most of them for the first time ever. "Darkness" (known as The Darkness on the previous tour) was the only song on the record that had been performed before this leg. "Amen", "Come Healing" and the aforementioned "Darkness" would become tour staples, played in every show on this leg. Other new songs that were performed more or less regular are "Going Home", "Different Sides", "Crazy to Love You", "Banjo" and "Anyhow". "Lullaby" and "Show Me the Place" remained the only two songs from the album not played on this leg.

Apart from the new songs, some older songs made their way into the set, most notably the song Alexandra Leaving. It was performed in every show entirely by Sharon Robinson after a short introduction by Cohen. The song was preceded by the song Coming Back to You from the album Various Positions. It was performed in an acoustic version by the Webb Sisters, with Charlie and Hattie Webb taking over the vocals and instrumentation (harp and guitar). Both songs were not played on the previous tour. Other songs that were not performed on the previous tour were "I Can't Forget", "The Guests", and "Light As the Breeze" (performed for the first time ever). "Night Comes On" was played regularly on this leg of the tour after having only two outings on the previous tour.

The concerts themselves were longer than the concerts at the beginning of the last tour. Opening night in Ghent for example featured 33 songs, with four encore blocks containing 9 songs. The concerts of this leg would often end close to or at curfew of the respective venues, with the last song often being "Save the Last Dance for Me", a song made famous by The Drifters. Overall, 40 different songs were performed on this leg.

First North American leg

The North American leg of the tour was announced via Cohen's official website on 3 May 2012. The first concerts to be announced were 11 in the United States and 10 in Canada. Cohen later announced second concerts in Montreal and Toronto due to increasing public demand. Soon after a second concerts were announced for Austin, Texas and  Boston, Massachusetts.

The concerts themselves followed the same structure as the first leg of the tours. Songs not performed in North America that were played in Europe were "Crazy to Love You" and "Light As the Breeze". Instead, a selection of other songs made their debut, including "Show Me the Place", leaving "Lullaby" as the only song from "Old Ideas" not played on this tour. "Going Home" became a concert staple, being played every night of this leg. Other songs that were played for the first time on this leg of the tour include "The Guests", "Joan of Arc" (both not played on the previous tour) as well as "Lover Lover Lover", "Chelsea Hotel #2" and the as-of-now unreleased "Feels So Good". This leg also featured a rare cover of George Dor's "La Manic", played in the Franco-Canadian part of the tour. Altogether, 46 different songs were performed at the 25 concerts of this leg.

Second North American leg

In January 2013, new dates for concerts in Canada and the United States were announced. The concerts were held in March and April, before the European Summer leg.

The tour commenced after a two-month break, for another 21 shows in North America. Tour premieres in this leg of the tour included the song "Avalanche", while "Coming Back to You" was dropped from the setlists, after having received only little attention on the previous leg, in favor of "If It Be Your Will", a concert staple on the last tour. The Old Ideas songs "Anyhow" and "Show Me the Place" were featured in most shows on this leg, while "Different Sides" was only played twice. "Choices", made famous by George Jones was played in honor of his recent passing, making it the third cover version being played on this tour. 39 different songs were played on this leg of the tour.

Second European leg

In December 2012 the first dates for 2013 were announced with concerts to take place in Europe. Altogether, 32 shows have been announced. On his second run through Europe, Cohen revisited some of the larger cities, e.g. Amsterdam, Berlin, Dublin, London and Paris, but also included some new stops, including performances in Croatia, Czech Republic, Slovenia and Poland as well as Switzerland and Austria. Only two shows were open air, most of the performances were indoors at larger arenas.

The shows themselves followed the structure of previous legs on this tour very closely, although noticeably shorter in length and with less songs performed. So featured the first concert in Berlin in 2012 29 songs and had to be cut short due to curfew constraints, whereas the second concert in 2013 featured only 26 songs, with a full length encore block.
"Different Sides" and "Show Me the Place" went unplayed during this leg, which meant that the latter one has not been performed on Europe to this date. All three cover songs were played, with "Save the Last Dance for Me" being performed 16 times. "Avalanche", "Night Comes On" and "Hey, That's No Way to Say Goodbye" were rarities that received only little attention. The song "Anyhow" was performed at a few venues in the United Kingdom.
A noticeable change in the setlist occurred during the early part of the leg when "Anthem" was dropped from the show. It had been a staple during the last tour and this tour until that point, having been performed at all shows, usually closing the first set. It was played only 6 times during the last 23 shows of this leg. Its place was taken over by the song "Lover Lover Lover". 
Similar to the last tour, Cohen presented a new song to his audience. "I've Got a Secret" had its debut at the second Dublin show, and has been performed twice more after that. It is described as an evolution of the song "Feels So Good", sharing some lines with the song.

On this leg of the tour, 43 different songs have been performed.

Australia/New Zealand leg

On 29 July 2013 it was announced on Cohen's official page that the tour would continue in November and December with concerts in New Zealand and Australia. Additional concerts for Wellington, Sydney and Melbourne were announced a few weeks after. However, the Australian concerts of those concerts were rescheduled to smaller venues, indicating much slower ticket sales than anticipated.

The last leg of the tour consisted of 16 concerts in both countries, including two open air shows for the "A Day On The Green" concert series. The setlist included "Anthem" again as the closing song of the first set at all concerts. Overall there was very little variation, with only 30 different songs being played (a standard setlist included between 25 and 28 songs). "In My Secret Life" was played on two occasions towards the beginning of the leg, as was the song "Waiting for the Miracle". The latter one re-appeared at the Wellington and Auckland concerts, though in a much different and 'darker' version as compared to the previous version that was played during this and last tour. The song "I've Got a Secret" was also played on a few occasions during the encores. The final concert of the tour was played on 21 December 2013 in Auckland, New Zealand; with no indication on any future tour or any other release plans.

Tour dates

Festivals and other miscellaneous performances

Cancellations and rescheduled shows

Critical response

The tour received universal praise from media and fans alike. Guido Lauwaert (Knack) wrote about opening night "The 78-year-old poet and singer seems 50 years younger for the duration of the concert. What strikes me is a total lack of false feelings…". Bart Steenhaut (DeMorgen) gave high praise to the musicians and Cohen himself, saying "Everyone was given ample opportunity to solo, and both backup singer – Sharon Robinson and the British Webb Sisters – were handed Cohen songs which they could shine on. Cohen himself singing downright excellent, though his deep, almost otherworldly baritone had not much variation in the set, exactly why was it right that the ladies often introduced a different timbre, and the rest of the band – all virtuoso with an impressive track record – could demonstrate their skill." Another reviewer (Robert Heller of Bloomberg Businessweek) states of the Berlin show in 2012 that "On record, Cohen has tended toward more spartan sounds, stripped back to just his voice and an acoustic guitar. Live, he has assembled an immaculate band. It plays with a manicured sweetness: A mandolin and violin add spice and color, a Hammond organ richness and depth. The Webb Sisters and Sharon Robinson provide luminous backing, careful arrangements making full use of each singer's tone."

Especially Cohen's appearance on stage found praise by many reviewers. Craig Jones of eGigs (UK) states of the concert at the Wembley Arena, "He may refer to himself on the self-deprecating Going Home as "a lazy bastard living in a suit", but Cohen is in fact quite the opposite. Just two weeks away from his 78th birthday, the fact that he is still able to deliver a three and a half hour set of intense beauty, melancholy and drama is quite a feat. He may be promoting ‘Old Ideas’, but still after all this time, those ideas remain the very best.".

Songs performed

Source:

Band
Leonard Cohen – vocals, acoustic guitar, keyboard
Roscoe Beck – bass, musical director
Sharon Robinson – vocals
Rafael Gayol – drums, percussion
Neil Larsen – keyboards, accordion
Mitch Watkins – guitars
Javier Mas – laúd, bandurria, guitar
Alexandru Bublitchi – violin
Mike Scoble* – harmonica, tour manager
The Webb Sisters:
 Charley Webb – backing vocals, guitar
 Hattie Webb – backing vocals, harp
*Scoble only performs as a guest performer in one song, 'Darkness', though he has not appeared every night.

References

External links
LeonardCohen.com – Official website of Leonard Cohen
LeonardCohenFiles.com – Tour Guide

2012 concert tours
2013 concert tours
Leonard Cohen concert tours